"24 Xmas Time" is Mai Kuraki's thirtieth single, released on November 26, 2008. It was released in two formats: limited CD+DVD edition and regular edition. The title track, "24 Xmas Time", features a rap sequence by hip-hop artist Ken-Ryw.

Usage in media
 TBS "Koisuru Hanikami!" November ending theme (#1)
 Music.jp CM song (#1)
 Daiba Memorial Tree image song (#1)

Track listing

Charts

Oricon Sales Chart

Billboard Japan Sales Chart

External links
Kuraki Mai Official Website

Mai Kuraki songs
2008 singles
2008 songs
Songs written by Mai Kuraki
Song recordings produced by Daiko Nagato